On 10 January 1985, a gas leak occurred at Björkborn, Karlskoga Municipality, Sweden, when a chemical plant spewed sulfuric acid gas over Karlskoga. The incident forced 300 people to evacuate and injured 20 people.

Accident 
On 10 January 1985, pre-7 pm local time, a gas leak was discovered at the Björkborn Industrial Zone, located northeast of the Björkborn Manor, spewing sulfuric acid gas over the nearby area. The gas container stopped leaking by 3 am local time still the gas had reacted with the fog. Thus, resulting in an almost opaque-like fog covering the town of Karlskoga.

Response 
Schools and offices were closed, all 36,000 inhabitants had to stay inside their homes, and traffic on the European Route E18 stopped, all in response to the gas leak.  

In addition, approximately 20 people sought treatment at an emergency clinic set up at a local school, treating chest pains and coughing.

See also 

 Bofors

References

External links 

 Gas leak report at the Swedish Civil Contingencies Agency

1985 in Sweden
1985 gas leak
Chemical disasters
Man-made disasters in Sweden
Bofors